The  is a Buddhist scripture, a sutta collection in the Khuddaka Nikaya, part of the Pali Canon of Theravada Buddhism.

Sections
The Sutta Nipāta is divided into five sections:

Uraga Vagga ("The Chapter on the Serpent")

Cūla Vagga ("The Minor Chapter")

Mahā Vagga ("The Great Chapter")

Atthaka Vagga "The Chapter of Octads"

            
Parayana Vagga ("The Chapter on the Way Beyond")

Context
Some scholars believe that it describes the oldest of all Buddhist practices. Others such as Bhikkhu Bodhi and K. R. Norman agree that it contains much early material.

In the Chinese Buddhist canon, a version of the Aṭṭhakavagga has survived. Fragmentary materials from a Sanskrit version of the Nipata also survive.

The Niddesa, a commentary in two parts on the contents of the Atthaka Vagga and portions of the Parayana Vagga, is included in the Pali Canon as a book of the Khuddaka Nikāya. This commentary is traditionally attributed to Śāriputra, and its presence in the canon is regarded as evidence of the relatively early composition of the Sutta Nipata.

English Translations

 The Silent Sages of Old, Suttas from the Suttanipāta   by Ven. Ñāṇadīpa Mahāthera, 2018
 Tr V. Fausbøll, in Sacred Books of the East, volume X, Clarendon/Oxford, 1881; reprinted by Motilal Banarsidass, Delhi (?and by Dover, New York)
 Buddha’s Teachings being the Sutta-nipāta or Discourse-Collection, tr. Robert Chalmers Delhi, India,  Motilal Barnasidass Publishers, 1932 (reprint in 1997), 300 p., .
 Woven cadences of early Buddhists, transl. by E. M. Hare. Sacred Books of the Buddhists vol.15, repr. - London: Oxford University Press, 1947 Internet Archive (PDF 11.4 MB)
 The Group of Discourses, tr K. R. Norman, 1984, Pali Text Society, Bristol; the original edition included alternative translations by I. B. Horner & Walpola Rahula; these are currently available in the paperback edition under the title The Rhinoceros Horn and Other Early Buddhist Poems; the current edition under the original title omits these, but includes instead the translator's notes, not included in the paperback
 Tr Saddhatissa, Curzon, London/Humanities Press, New York, 1985
 Tr N. A. Jayawickrama, University of Kelaniya, 2001
 The Discourse Collection Selected Texts from the Sutta Nipata, by John D. Ireland, Access to Insight (BCBS Edition), 2013. Available for free download here

German Translation

 Tr Nyanaponika, Verlag Beyerlein & Steinschulte, D 95236 Stammbach, Germany, 3. Auflage 1996

See also
 List of all Khuddaka Nikaya suttas
 Atthakavagga and Parayanavagga, widely considered some of the earliest Buddhist texts
 Rhinoceros Sutta, widely considered one of the earliest Buddhist texts

References

Citations

Sources

External links

Sutta Nipata (Access to Insight)
Sutta Nipata Lectures taught by Bhikkhu Bodhi
Translations at dhammatalks.org
Suttanipāta - Anthology of Discourses at suttacentral.net

Khuddaka Nikaya